Panchkot Raj, also known as Panchkot Zamindari or Kashipur Raj, was a Kudmi family of Zamindars who ruled in the western fringe areas of present-day West Bengal, India and some adjacent areas in present-day Jharkhand.

History
According to the legends, while Raja Jagat Deo was going for pilgrimage in Puri from his kingdom in Dhar in modern Madhya Pradesh, his wife gave birth to a son while camping at Jhalda, currently in Purulia district. The king’s entourage believed the child had been born dead, and left him there. Later the child was found by seven local peoples and was named Damodar Sekhar. It was Damodar Sekhar who established the Panchkot Royal dynasty in the 17th century.

After the independence of India, the Indian Parliament subjected the right to property to certain restrictions and states began to initiate aggressive agrarian reforms by passing laws that abolished the Zamindari system. This led the family to sue at the Supreme Court. In 1951, a bench of five judges unanimously ruled in favor of the government.

See also
 Jharia Raj

External links

References

Bengali zamindars
Purulia district
Zamindari estates